Delaware is the debut studio album by American indie rock band Drop Nineteens. It was released on June 19, 1992 by Caroline Records. Hut Records issued the album, along with the single "Winona", in the United Kingdom the same year.

On April 20, 2009, Delaware was reissued by Cherry Red Records with four bonus tracks from the band's 1992 EP Your Aquarium. In 2016, Pitchfork ranked Delaware at number 45 on its list of the 50 best shoegaze albums of all time.

Track listing

Personnel
Credits are adapted from the album's liner notes.

Drop Nineteens
 Greg Ackell – guitar, vocals
 Paula Kelley – vocals, guitar
 Chris Roof – drums
 Motohiro Yasue – guitar
 Steve Zimmerman – bass

Production
 Vincent Buckholtz II – mixing, recording (assistant)
 Paul Degooyer – production, mixing, recording
 Drop Nineteens – production
 Dave Snider – recording
 Jennifer Spaziani – mixing (assistant)
 Jeff Way – mixing (assistant)

Design
 Petrisse Brièl – photography
 Ellie Hughes – design
 Tom Hughes – design
 Turlach MacDonagh – photography

Charts

References

External links
 

1992 debut albums
Drop Nineteens albums
Caroline Records albums
Hut Records albums